Ken Anderson is an American motorsport engineer, operating over the course of his career in Motocross, IndyCar, Formula One, IRL and NASCAR.

US F1 Team
In late 2008 it was announced that along with Peter Windsor, Anderson would be founding the Formula One team US F1, which lodged a successful bid for a 2010 season entry.

Due to contracted sponsorship money not being paid, the team was forced to withdraw from the championship.

References

Formula One team owners
NASCAR people
IndyCar Series people
Year of birth missing (living people)
Living people
American motorsport people